Dimitra Giakoumi (born November 26, 1982 in Athens, Greece) is a female professional volleyball player from Greece, who has been a member of the Greece women's national volleyball team. At club level, she played for Greek powerhouse Olympiacos Piraeus from 2010 to 2013, winning 1 Greek Championship and 3 Greek Cups. As Olympiacos captain, she led the club to the first Greek Championship in its history in 2012–13 season,
being voted Greek Championship 2012–13 MVP in the process.

Sporting achievements

National championships
 2012/2013  Greek Championship, with Olympiacos Piraeus

National cups
 2010/2011  Greek Cup, with Olympiacos Piraeus
 2011/2012  Greek Cup, with Olympiacos Piraeus
 2012/2013  Greek Cup, with Olympiacos Piraeus

Individual
 2012/2013 Greek Championship: MVP

References

External links
 profile at greekvolley.gr 
 profile at CEV web site at cev.lu

1982 births
Living people
Olympiacos Women's Volleyball players
Greek women's volleyball players
Volleyball players from Athens
21st-century Greek women